The Powell Main Post Office in Powell, Wyoming, was built in 1937 as part of a facilities improvement program by the United States Post Office Department.  The post office in Powell was nominated to the National Register of Historic Places as part of a thematic study comprising twelve Wyoming post offices built to standardized USPO plans in the early twentieth century.

The post office contains the mural, Powell's Agriculture Resulting from the Shoshine Irrigation Project by Verona Burkhard, painted in 1938 and funded by the Section of Painting and Sculpture.

References

External links
 at the National Park Service's NRHP database
Powell Main Post Office at the Wyoming State Historic Preservation Office

Buildings and structures in Park County, Wyoming
Government buildings completed in 1937
National Register of Historic Places in Park County, Wyoming
Post office buildings in Wyoming
Post office buildings on the National Register of Historic Places in Wyoming
Powell, Wyoming
New Deal in Wyoming